Thomas (Tom) Cavalier-Smith, FRS, FRSC, NERC Professorial Fellow (21 October 1942 – 19 March 2021), was a professor of evolutionary biology in the Department of Zoology, at the University of Oxford.

His research has led to discovery of a number of unicellular organisms (protists) and advocated for a variety of major taxonomic groups, such as the Chromista, Chromalveolata, Opisthokonta, Rhizaria, and Excavata. He was known for his systems of classification of all organisms.

Life and career
Cavalier-Smith was born on 21 October 1942 in London. His parents were Mary Maude (née Bratt) and Alan Hailes Spencer Cavalier Smith.

He was educated at Norwich School, Gonville and Caius College, Cambridge (MA) and King's College London (PhD). He was under the supervision of Sir John Randall for his PhD thesis between 1964 and 1967; his thesis was entitled "Organelle Development in Chlamydomonas reinhardii".

From 1967 to 1969, Cavalier-Smith was a guest investigator at Rockefeller University. He became Lecturer of biophysics at King's College London in 1969. He was promoted to Reader in 1982.
From the early 1980s, Smith promoted views about the taxonomic relationships among living organisms. He was prolific, drawing on a near-unparalleled wealth of information to suggest novel relationships.
In 1989 he was appointed Professor of Botany at the University of British Columbia.
In 1999, he joined the University of Oxford, becoming Professor of evolutionary biology in 2000.

Thomas Cavalier-Smith died in March 2021 following the development of cancer.

Taxonomy
Cavalier-Smith was a prolific taxonomist, drawing on a near-unparalleled wealth of information to suggest novel relationships. His suggestions were translated into taxonomic concepts and classifications with which he associated new names, or in some cases, reused old names.
Cavalier-Smith did not follow or espouse an explicit taxonomic philosophy but his approach was closest to evolutionary taxonomy. He and several other colleagues were opposed to cladistic approaches to taxonomy arguing that the goals of cladification and classification were different; his approach was similar to that of many others' broad-based treatments of protists.

The scope of Cavalier-Smith's taxonomic propositions was grand, but the numbers and composition of the components (taxa), and, often, their relations were not stable. Propositions were often ambiguous and short-lived; he frequently amended taxa without any change in the name. His approach was not universally accepted: Others attempted to underpin taxonomy of protists with a nested series of atomised, falsifiable propositions, following the philosophy of transformed cladistics. However, this approach is no longer considered defensible.

Cavalier-Smith's ideas that led to the taxonomic structures were usually first presented in the form of tables and complex, annotated diagrams. When presented at scientific meetings, they were sometimes too rich, and often written too small, for the ideas to be easily grasped. Some such diagrams made their way into publications, where careful scrutiny was possible, and where the conjectural nature of some assertions was evident. The richness of his ideas, their continuing evolution, and the transition into taxonomies that gave Cavalier-Smith's investigations into evolutionary paths (phylogeny) and the resulting classifications, its distinctive character.

Four major influences
Thomas Cavalier-Smith worked at a time when there was a pervasive presumption that classification should reflect evolutionary pathways. How this should be done had four major influences, as described in the following subsections.

Prior representation
First, was a residue of the 'traditional' approach that admitted speculation and which lacked any explicit rigor as to how a particular evolutionary insight should be translated into the arrangement and ranks of taxa. Inherent to this approach were narratives about character evolution and classifications that included paraphyletic taxa, and in which degree of difference would influence the rank assigned to taxa.

Popperian philosophy of science
The second influence was the philosophy as to how scientific progress was made. It had been articulated by K. Popper and had shifted the emphasis from verification of ideas to the falsification of hypotheses.

Popper saw that science progressed by a process that eliminated unsound hypotheses, so whittling down of the array of possible explanations leading towards the explanations which were more likely correct.  To fit into this process, hypotheses needed to be falsifiable.

Cladistics 
The third influence was cladistics – an explicit way of presenting (and then "falsifying", although see) evolutionary hypotheses. This was initially articulated by Willi Hennig, and was increasingly (but not universally) accepted by many as how taxonomy should be done. The justification of the cladistic approach in terms of Popperian hypothetico-deductivism was popular in the 1970s and 1980s but is no longer considered defensible (see Sober and reviewed in Rieppel).

Genetic sequencing
Fourthly, technical advances in sequencing technology led to a massive growth of hypotheses about evolutionary relationships based on the similarities among sequences of compared organisms. Algorithms were used to analyse sequence data, with the results being usually presented in the form of dendrograms.

Cavalier-Smith's narrative style
Cavalier-Smith was courageous in his adherence to the earlier traditionalist style characterized by Charles Darwin, that of relying on narratives. One example was his advocacy for the Chromista that united lineages that had plastids with chlorophylls a and c (primarily chrysophytes and other stramenopiles, cryptophytes, and haptophytes) despite clear evidence that the group corresponded to a clade.

It was Cavalier-Smith's claim that there was a single endosymbiotic event by which chlorophyll a c containing plastids were acquired by a common ancestor of all three groups, and that the differences (such as cytological components and their arrangements) among the groups were the result of subsequent evolutionary changes. This interpretation that chromists were monophyletic also required that the heterotrophic (protozoan) members of all three groups had arisen from ancestors with plastids.

The alternative hypothesis was that the three chromophytic lineages were not closely related (to the exclusion of other lineages) (i.e. were polyphyletic), likely that all were ancestrally without plastids, and that separate symbiotic events established the chlorophyll a/c plastids stramenopiles, cryptomonads and haptophytes. The polyphyly of the chromists has been re-asserted in subsequent studies.

Cavalier-Smith's lack of an objective and reproducible methodology that would translate evolutionary insights into taxa and hierarchical schemes, were often confusing to those who did not follow his publications closely. Many of his taxa requiring his frequent adjustment, as illustrated below. In turn this led to confusion as to the scope of taxa a taxonomic name was applied to.

Cavalier-Smith also reused familiar names (such as Protozoa) for innovative taxonomic concepts. This created confusion because Protozoa was and still is used in its old sense, alongside its use in the newer senses. Because of Cavalier-Smith's tendency to publish rapidly and to change his narratives and taxonomic summaries frequently, his approach and claims were frequently debated.

Cavalier-Smith's contributions

Cavalier-Smith wrote extensively on the taxonomy and classification of all life forms, but especially protists. One of his major contributions to biology was his proposal of a new kingdom of life: the Chromista, even though it is not widely accepted to be monophyletic (see above).

He also introduced new taxonomic groupings group for eukaryotes such as the Chromalveolata (1981), Opisthokonta (1987), Rhizaria (2002), and Excavata (2002). Though well known, many of his claims have been controversial and have not gained widespread acceptance in the scientific community. His taxonomic revisions often influenced the overall classification of all life forms.

Eight kingdoms model
Cavalier-Smith's first major classification system was the division of all organisms into eight kingdoms. In 1981, he proposed that by completely revising Robert Whittaker's Five Kingdom system, there could be eight kingdoms: Bacteria, Eufungi, Ciliofungi, Animalia, Biliphyta, Viridiplantae, Cryptophyta, and Euglenozoa.

In 1983, he revised his system particularly in the light of growing evidence that Archaebacteria were a separate group from Bacteria, to include an array of lineages that had been excluded from his 1981 treatment, to deal with issues of polyphyly, and to promote new ideas of relationships. In addition, some protists lacking mitochondria were discovered. As mitochondria were known to be the result of the endosymbiosis of a proteobacterium, it was thought that these amitochondriate eukaryotes were primitively so, marking an important step in eukaryogenesis. As a result, these amitochondriate protists were given special status as a protozan subkingdom Archezoa, that he later elevated to kingdom status. This was later referred to as the Archezoa hypothesis. In, 1993, the eight kingdoms became: Eubacteria, Archaebacteria, Archezoa, Protozoa, Chromista, Plantae, Fungi, and Animalia.

The kingdom Archezoa went through many compositional changes due to evidence of polyphyly and paraphyly before being abandoned. He assigned some former members of the kingdom Archezoa to the phylum Amoebozoa.

Six kingdoms models
By 1998, Cavalier-Smith had reduced the total number of kingdoms from eight to six: Animalia, Protozoa, Fungi, Plantae (including Glaucophyte, red and green algae), Chromista, and Bacteria. Nevertheless, he had already presented this simplified scheme for the first time on his 1981 paper and endorsed it in 1983.

Five of Cavalier-Smith's kingdoms are classified as eukaryotes as shown in the following scheme:  
Eubacteria
Neomura
Archaebacteria
Eukaryotes
Kingdom Protozoa
 Unikonts (heterotrophs)
Kingdom Animalia
Kingdom Fungi
 Bikonts (primarily photosynthetic)
Kingdom Plantae (including red and green algae)
Kingdom Chromista

The kingdom Animalia was divided into four subkingdoms: Radiata (phyla Porifera, Cnidaria, Placozoa, and Ctenophora), Myxozoa, Mesozoa, and Bilateria (all other animal phyla).

He created three new animal phyla: Acanthognatha (rotifers, acanthocephalans, gastrotrichs, and gnathostomulids), Brachiozoa (brachiopods and phoronids), and Lobopoda (onychophorans and tardigrades)
and recognised a total of 23 animal phyla.

Cavalier-Smith's 2003 classification scheme:
 Unikonts
 protozoan phylum Amoebozoa (ancestrally uniciliate)
 opisthokonts
 uniciliate protozoan phylum Choanozoa
 kingdom Fungi
 kingdom Animalia
 Bikonts
 protozoan infrakingdom Rhizaria
 phylum Cercozoa
 phylum Retaria (Radiozoa and Foraminifera)
 protozoan infrakingdom Excavata
 phylum Loukozoa
 phylum Metamonada
 phylum Euglenozoa
 phylum Percolozoa
 protozoan phylum Apusozoa (Thecomonadea and Diphylleida)
 the chromalveolate clade
 kingdom Chromista (Cryptista, Heterokonta, and Haptophyta)
 protozoan infrakingdom Alveolata
 phylum Ciliophora
 phylum Miozoa (Protalveolata, Dinozoa, and Apicomplexa)
 kingdom Plantae (Viridaeplantae, Rhodophyta and Glaucophyta)

Seven kingdoms model
Cavalier-Smith and his collaborators revised the classification in 2015, and published it in PLOS ONE. In this scheme they reintroduced the division of prokaryotes into two kingdoms, Bacteria (previously 'Eubacteria') and Archaea (previously 'Archebacteria'). This is based on the consensus in the Taxonomic Outline of Bacteria and Archaea (TOBA) and the Catalogue of Life.

Proposed root of the tree of life 
In 2006, Cavalier-Smith proposed that the last universal common ancestor to all life was a non-flagellate Gram-negative bacterium ("negibacterium") with two membranes (also known as diderm bacterium).

Awards and honours
Cavalier-Smith was elected Fellow of the Linnean Society of London (FLS) in 1980, the Institute of Biology (FIBiol) in 1983, the Royal Society of Arts (FRSA) in 1987, the Canadian Institute for Advanced Research (CIFAR) in 1988, the Royal Society of Canada (FRSC) in 1997, and the Royal Society of London in 1998.

He received the International Prize for Biology from the Emperor of Japan in 2004, and the Linnean Medal for Zoology in 2007. He was appointed Fellow of the Canadian Institute for Advanced Research (CIFAR) between 1998 and 2007, and Advisor of the Integrated Microbial Biodiversity of CIFAR. He won the 2007 Frink Medal of the Zoological Society of London.

References

External links 

 

 

 

English biologists
Protistologists
1942 births
British evolutionary biologists
English humanists
English microbiologists
English taxonomists
Fellows of the Royal Society
People educated at Norwich School
Alumni of Gonville and Caius College, Cambridge
Alumni of King's College London
Academics of King's College London
Academics of the University of Oxford
20th-century biologists
21st-century biologists
20th-century British scientists
21st-century British scientists
2021 deaths
Thomas Cavalier-Smith